Szentlőrinci Sportegyesület is a professional football club based in Szentlőrinc, Baranya county, Hungary, that competes in the Nemzeti Bajnokság II, the second tier of Hungarian football.

Name changes
1912–1948: Szentlőrinci Vasutas SE
1948–1998: Szentlőrinci Sportegyesület
1998–2009: Szentlőrinc-Ormánság Takarékszövetkezet SE
1999–2009: merger with Pécsi Vasutas SK
2009–2010: Szentlőrinc-Pécsi Vasutas Sportkör SE
2010–present: Szentlőrinci Sportegyesület

History
On 16 June 2020, the club were promoted to the Nemzeti Bajnokság II since 2019-20 Nemzeti Bajnokság III-winner Érdi VSE did not want to be promoted to the second tier of the Hungarian League system.

Honours
Nemzeti Bajnokság III:
Winners: 2005–06, 2007–08, 2008–09

Current squad
.

Out on loan

External links
 Profile on Magyar Futball

References

Football clubs in Hungary
Association football clubs established in 1912
1912 establishments in Hungary